Chah Sorkhi (also Romanized as Chāh Sorkhī; also known as Chāh Sorkh) is a village in Zarqan Rural District, Zarqan District, Shiraz County, Fars Province, Iran. At the 2006 census, its population was 386, in 90 families.

References 

Populated places in Zarqan County